Zamia is a genus of cycad of the family Zamiaceae, native to North America from the United States (in Georgia and Florida) throughout the West Indies, Central America, and South America as far south as Bolivia. The genus is considered to be the most ecologically and morphologically diverse cycads, and is estimated to have originated about 68.3 million years ago.

Description
The genus comprises deciduous shrubs with aerial or subterranean circular stems, often superficially resembling palms. They produce spirally arranged, pinnate leaves which are pubescent, at least when young, having branched and simple, transparent and coloured hairs. The articulated leaflets lack a midrib, and are broad with subparallel dichotomous venation. Lower leaflets are not reduced to spines, though the petioles often have prickles. The emerging leaves of many Zamia species are striking, some emerging with a reddish or bronze cast (Z. roeslii being an example). Zamia picta is even more distinctive, being the only truly variegated cycad (having whitish/yellow speckles on the leaves).

Reproduction
Zamia sporophylls are born in vertical rows in cones, and the megasporophyll apices are faceted or flattened, not spinose. The fleshy seeds are subglobular to oblong or ellipsoidal, and are red, orange, yellow or rarely white. The endosperm is haploid, derived from the female gametophyte. The embryo is straight, with two cotyledons that are usually united at the tips and a very long, spirally twisted suspensor. The sperm of members from the genus are large, as is typical of cycads, and Z. roezlii is an example; its sperm are approximately 0.4 mm long and can be seen by the unaided eye.

Preferred habitat
All the species of Zamia produce leafy crowns of foliage that make them choice garden specimens and most varieties branch heavily in age to produce handsome clumps. With a few exceptions, most Zamia species are found in warm, humid, tropical rainforest habitats, growing in the forest understory. However, many species are still fairly adaptable, performing quite well in cultivation, especially in subtropical areas.  All species need good drainage and protection from the cold.

Ecology
At least one species, Z. pseudoparasitica, grows as an epiphyte in the branches of trees.

Species 
Accepted species:

 Zamia acuminata Oerst.ex Dyer - Costa Rica, Nicaragua, Panama
 Zamia amazonum D.W.Stev. - Venezuela, Colombia, Ecuador, Peru, Brazil 
 Zamia amplifolia Hort.Bull ex Mast. - Colombia
 Zamia angustifolia Jacq.  - The Bahamas, Cuba
 Zamia boliviana (Brongn.) A.DC.  - Bolivia, Brazil (Mato Grosso)
 Zamia chigua Seem. - Colombia
 Zamia cremnophila Vovides, Schutzman & Dehgan - Tabasco, Mexico
 Zamia cunaria Dressler & D.W.Stev. - Panama
 Zamia decumbens Calonje, Meerman, M.P. Griff. & Hoese - Belize
 Zamia disodon D.W.Stev. & Sabato - Colombia
 Zamia dressleri D.W.Stev. - Panama
 Zamia elegantissima Schutzman, Vovides & R.S.Adams - Panama
 Zamia encephalartoides D.W. Stev. - Colombia
 Zamia erosa O.F.Cook & G.N.Collins - Cuba, Jamaica, Puerto Rico
 Zamia fairchildiana L.D.Gómez - Panama, Costa Rica
 Zamia fischeri Miq. ex Lem. - 	Mexico (San Luis Potosí, Veracruz, Hidalgo, Querétaro, Tamaulipas)
 Zamia furfuracea L.f. - cardboard palm - Mexico (Veracruz)
 Zamia gentryi Dodson  Ecuador
 Zamia gomeziana R.H.Acuña - Costa Rica
 Zamia grijalvensis Pérez-Farr., Vovides & Mart.-Camilo -  Mexico (Chiapas)
 Zamia hamannii A.S.Taylor, J.L.Haynes & Holzman - Panama
 Zamia herrerae Calderón & Standl. -  Mexico (Chiapas), El Salvador, Guatemala, Nicaragua, Honduras
 Zamia huilensis Calonje, H.E.Esquivel & D.W.Stev. Colombia
 Zamia hymenophyllidia D.W.Stev. - Colombia, Peru
 Zamia imperialis A.S.Taylor, J.L.Haynes & Holzman - Panama
 Zamia incognita A.Lindstr. & Idárraga - Colombia
 Zamia inermis Vovides, J.D.Rees & Vázq.Torres - Mexico (Veracruz)
 Zamia integrifolia L.f. - coontie palm/Florida arrowroot - United States (Florida, Georgia), Bahamas, Cayman Islands, Cuba, Puerto Rico
 Zamia ipetiensis D.W.Stev. - Panama
 Zamia katzeriana (Regel) E.Rettig - Mexico
 Zamia lacandona Schutzman & Vovides - Mexico (Chiapas)
 Zamia lecointei Ducke - Brazil (Pará), Venezuela, Colombia, Peru
 Zamia lindenii Regel ex André - Peru, Ecuador
 Zamia lindleyi Warsz. ex A.Dietr. - Panama
 Zamia loddigesii Miq. Belize, El Salvador, Honduras, Mexico (Campeche, Chiapas, Veracruz, Puebla, Oaxaca, Hidalgo, Tabasco, Tamaulipas, Quintana Roo, Yucatán
 Zamia lucayana Britton - Bahamas
 Zamia macrochiera D.W.Stev. - Peru
 Zamia manicata Linden ex Regel - Panama, Colombia
 Zamia meermanii Calonje - Belize
 Zamia melanorrhachis D.W.Stev. - Colombia
 Zamia montana A.Braun - Colombia
 Zamia monticola Chamb. - Guatemala
 Zamia muricata Willd. - Colombia, Venezuela
 Zamia nana A.Lindstr., Calonje, D.W.Stev. & A.S.Taylor Panama
 Zamia nesophila A.S.Taylor, J.L.Haynes & Holzman - Panama
 Zamia neurophyllidia D.W.Stev. - Panama, Nicaragua, Costa Rica
 Zamia obliqua A.Braun - Colombia
 Zamia onan-reyesii C.Nelson & Sandoval - Honduras
 Zamia oreillyi C.Nelson - Honduras
 Zamia paucijuga Wieland - Mexico (Guerrero, Jalisco, Colima, Michoacán, Nayarit, Oaxaca)
 Zamia poeppigiana Mart. & Eichler  - Bolivia, Brazil (Acre)
 Zamia portoricensis Urb. - Puerto Rico
 Zamia prasina W.Bull - Belize, Mexico (Tabasco, Yucatán)
 Zamia pseudomonticola L.D.Gómez - Panama, Costa Rica
 Zamia pseudoparasitica Yates - Panama
 Zamia pumila L. - guáyara / Dominican zamia - Hispaniola (Dominican Republic), possibly Cuba; possibly extirpated in Puerto Rico and Haiti
 Zamia purpurea Vovides, J.D.Rees & Vázq.Torres - Mexico (Veracruz, Oaxaca)
 Zamia pygmaea Sims - Cuba
 Zamia pyrophylla Calonje, D.W.Stev. & A.Lindstr. - Colombia
 Zamia restrepoi (D.W.Stev.) A.Lindstr. - Colombia
 Zamia roezlii Regel ex Linden - Colombia, Ecuador
 Zamia sandovalii C.Nelson - Honduras
 Zamia skinneri Warsz. ex A.Dietr. - Panama
 Zamia soconuscensis Schutzman, Vovides & Dehgan - Mexico (Chiapas)
 Zamia spartea A.DC. in A.P.de Candolle - Mexico (Oaxaca)
 Zamia standleyi Schutzman - Guatemala, Honduras
 Zamia stevensonii A.S.Taylor & Holzman Panama
 Zamia stricta Miq. - Cuba
 Zamia tolimensis Calonje, H.E.Esquivel & D.W.Stev -  Colombia
 Zamia tuerckheimii Donn.Sm. - Guatemala
 Zamia ulei Dammer - Venezuela, Colombia, Ecuador, Peru, Brazil 
 Zamia urep B.Walln. - Peru
 Zamia variegata Warsz. - Mexico (Chiapas), Belize, Guatemala
 Zamia vazquezii D.W.Stev., Sabato & De Luca - Mexico (Veracruz)
 Zamia verschaffeltii Miq. - Mexico (Veracruz, Tabasco, Chiapas)
 Zamia wallisii H.J.Veitch - Colombia

References

External links
 
  
 The Cycad Pages: Genus Zamia
 Zamia, by Ada Welsch

Further reading
 Lindström, A.J. and Idárraga, Á. (2009). Zamia incognita (Zamiaceae): the exciting discovery of a new gymnosperm from Colombia. Phytotaxa 2: 29-34.

 
Zamiaceae